Hughes Middle School is the name of many 4 year middle schools, including:

Hughes Middle School (Long Beach, California)
Langston Hughes Middle School (Reston, Virginia)
Paulene Hughes Middle School (Burleson, Texas)
Hughes Academy of Science and Technology (Greenville, South Carolina)